This discography documents albums and singles released by American R&B and soul singer Deniece Williams.

Albums

Studio albums

Compilation albums

Singles

 Singles credited to Denise Chandler
 Singles credited to Deniece Chandler

Covers
 "Glass Apple", "Diamond Eyes". Romantique - Seiko Ballads. 1991. Sony Records

References

Discographies of American artists
Rhythm and blues discographies
Soul music discographies